Humberto Alejandro Castro Ward (born December 15, 1984) is a Mexican actor of films and television. He became a legal U.S. resident on July 12, 2006 and was sworn in as a naturalized U.S. citizen on December 15, 2011. In 2016, he officially started his own film production company called Award Pictures.

Early life
Humberto Alejandro Castro Ward was born on December 15, 1984 in Ciudad Juárez, Chihuahua, Mexico and raised across the border in El Paso, Texas. As a teenager, he received his first video camera as a gift from his mother and immediately began to develop a passion for acting, screenwriting and filmmaking. He graduated from Father Yermo High School in 2003 and went on to attend The University of Texas at El Paso where he earned his B.A. in Psychology and Minor in Criminal Justice in 2010.

Career 
Shortly after his college graduation, Castro spontaneously enrolled into acting courses at Latin American Talent Studio; which reignited his true passion and motivated him to pursue a career in the film industry instead. His talents and creativity as an actor, screenwriter and filmmaker were showcased on-screen from the very beginning. He is locally known for his work on several short films as well as his first feature film called El Sueño (2016).

Personal life 
Castro married his longtime girlfriend Lorraine Sanchez on August 23, 2014.

Selected filmography

References

External links
 http://kodiapps.com/actor-1529185

Mexican emigrants to the United States
1984 births
American male film actors
Mexican male film actors
Living people
21st-century Mexican male actors
Naturalized citizens of the United States
Undocumented immigrants to the United States